Smash Records was an American record label founded in 1961 as a subsidiary of Mercury Records  by Mercury executive Shelby Singleton and run by Singleton with Charlie Fach. Fach took over after Singleton left Mercury in 1966. Its recording artists included Frankie Valli, James Brown, Bruce Channel, Roger Miller, The Left Banke, Bill Justis, and Jerry Lee Lewis.

History 
A dispute with King Records led Brown to release all of his band's instrumental recordings between 1964 and 1967 on Smash. Smash also released three of Brown's vocal recordings, including his 1964 proto-funk single "Out of Sight".

Smash shared the numbering system for their singles with other labels that they distributed. The most important of these was Fontana Records. Mercury discontinued the Smash label in 1970.

Mercury label owner PolyGram used the Smash imprint for reissues in the 1980s. PolyGram revived Smash in 1991 as an R&B/dance label with its offices located in Chicago. It was first under the PolyGram Label Group (PLG) umbrella, then under the Independent Label Sales (ILS) umbrella, then under Island Records until the imprint was retired in 1996. One of the hits Smash saw during this period was "People Are Still Having Sex" by house music producer LaTour. Another successful artist on the dance charts was Jamie Principle.

Artists

The Angels
The Asylum Choir
James Brown
The Caravelles
Mother Maybelle Carter
Jimmy Castor
Bruce Channel
Crunch-O-Matic
D'Bora
Dee Jay & The Runaways (see also Iowa Great Lakes Recording Company)
Joe Dowell
Pete Drake (and his talking steel guitar)
Jay & the Techniques
Bill Justis
Dickie Lee
Hudsen Bay Co.
Left Banke
Jerry Lee Lewis
Linda Gail Lewis
Jamie Loring
LaTour
Chris Mars

M-Doc
The Mesmerizing Eye
Luke "Long Gone" Miles
Roger Miller
The Millions
The Nouns
Jamie Principle
Charlie Rich
Sir Douglas Quintet
Millie Small
Swingin' Medallions
Pleasure Game
Presence
Sheep on Drugs
 The Tempests
Ten Tray
Frankie Valli
Eric Von Schmidt
The Walker Brothers
Scott Walker
Cookie Watkins
Yello

See also 
 List of record labels

References

External links
 The Smash Records Story from BSN Pubs
 A discography of Smash albums
 A discography of Smash singles
 A biography of Pete Drake
 

American record labels
Record labels established in 1961
Record labels disestablished in 1970
Record labels established in 1991
Record labels disestablished in 1996
Re-established companies
1961 establishments in the United States
Philips